Peggy Feltmate is Canadian politician who was Ottawa city councillor representing Kanata South Ward from 2003 to 2010.

She was born in Wallaceburg, Ontario, in 1949 and was first elected in the 2003 Ottawa election to replace outgoing councillor Alex Munter in Kanata Ward.  She had won plaudits for her efforts at the Western Ottawa Community Resource Centre and was backed by Munter and other well-known Kanata figures.

During her first term in office, Feltmate helped prevent development of the area around Beaver Pond.

Due to population growth, her ward was split in two in 2006. She was re-elected in 2006 in the new Kanata South Ward.

In February 2010, Feltmate announced that she would not run for re-election in the 2010 Ottawa municipal election, though she would continue to serve the community on a part-time, volunteer basis.

References

External links
City biography

Ottawa city councillors
Living people
1949 births
Members of the United Church of Canada
Women municipal councillors in Canada
Women in Ontario politics